Paragomphus lacustris is a species of dragonfly in the family Gomphidae. It is found in the Democratic Republic of the Congo, Tanzania, and possibly Uganda. Its natural habitat is freshwater lakes.

Sources

Gomphidae
Taxonomy articles created by Polbot
Insects described in 1890